The Crockett Street Dining and Entertainment Complex is located in Downtown Beaumont, Texas. It consists of five restored buildings built at the turn of the 20th century. They were used for various businesses then, but now host restaurants and various entertainment venues.
From Left to right, the historic names are: Wilson Building, Littleton Building, Millard Building,  Dixie Hotel.

See also

National Register of Historic Places listings in Jefferson County, Texas

References

External links

Buildings and structures in Beaumont, Texas
Streets in Texas
Entertainment districts in Texas
Restaurant districts and streets in the United States
Tourist attractions in Beaumont, Texas
Historic district contributing properties in Texas
National Register of Historic Places in Jefferson County, Texas